Peytons Store is an unincorporated community in  Casey County, Kentucky, United States. It was also known as Alstotts Store.

References

Unincorporated communities in Casey County, Kentucky
Unincorporated communities in Kentucky